Wellington Lake is a lake situated in the Keelachiruvoi Village,(Near Tittakudi) Tittakudi taluk of the Cuddalore district in the Indian state of Tamil Nadu. It is the second-largest lake in Tamil Nadu after the Veeranam Lake, which also is situated in the Cuddalore district.

It is primarily a rain-fed lake, while its main tributary is the Vellar River that originates from the Shevaroy Hills. Smaller creeks that originate from the Nangoor reserve forest and the Lakkur reserve forest form the secondary tributaries.

The lake is also a noted trout fishery and home to a small-scale inland fishing industry.

References

Reservoirs in Tamil Nadu
Cuddalore district